Guadalupe Pérez Domínguez (born 25 June 1972) is a Mexican politician from the Institutional Revolutionary Party. From 2009 to 2012 she served as Deputy of the LXI Legislature of the Mexican Congress representing Chihuahua.

References

1972 births
Living people
Politicians from Chihuahua (state)
Women members of the Chamber of Deputies (Mexico)
Institutional Revolutionary Party politicians
21st-century Mexican politicians
21st-century Mexican women politicians
Autonomous University of Chihuahua alumni
People from Ciudad Cuauhtémoc, Chihuahua
Deputies of the LXI Legislature of Mexico
Members of the Chamber of Deputies (Mexico) for Chihuahua (state)